Kanchrapara College, established in 1972, is the general degree college at Kanchrapara, in North 24 Parganas district, West Bengal. It offers undergraduate courses in arts, commerce and sciences. The college has a rich library with huge collection of printed and electronic documents. It is affiliated to University of Kalyani.

History 
This College was established in 13 November 1972, under the guidance of the then Member of the Legislative Assembly (India) of the area, Mr. Jagadish Chandra Das. Initially it started its journey with only 32 students by affiliation of only Pre-University class.

Departments

Science
Chemistry
Physics
Mathematics
Computer Science
Botany
Zoology
Environmental Science
Food and Nutrition
Microbiology
Molecular Biology and Biotechnology
Environmental Science

Arts and Commerce
Bengali
English
Sanskrit
Hindi (B.A and M.A)
History
Geography
Political Science
Philosophy
Economics
Commerce

Library
The library is called Central Library. Everyone can search the collections by clicking library web-page. Library has a web OPAC.
Library provides different services to users

 CAS
 Reprographic Service
 Reference Service
 e-conrner services

Accreditation
Kanchrapara College was awarded a B+ grade by the National Assessment and Accreditation Council (NAAC). The college is recognized by the University Grants Commission (UGC).

See also

References

External links
Kanchrapara College
University of Kalyani
University Grants Commission
National Assessment and Accreditation Council

Universities and colleges in North 24 Parganas district
Colleges affiliated to University of Kalyani
Educational institutions established in 1972
1972 establishments in West Bengal